Gilles Coustellier (born 13 May 1986 in Martigues, France) is a French mountain bike trials cyclist. He specialises in 26-inch trials but has also competed in 20-inch trials.

Coustellier was UCI junior world champion in the 20-inch category in 2002 and then in the 26-inch category in 2003. In the UCI elite 26-inch category he has been world champion five times, more than any other rider. Competing with the French team he was team trials world champion in 2011.

Gilles is the younger brother of Giacomo Coustellier, who is also a trials rider.

References

External links
 Official website

French male cyclists
Mountain bike trials riders
UCI Mountain Bike World Champions (men)
Living people
1986 births
People from Martigues
Sportspeople from Bouches-du-Rhône
Cyclists from Provence-Alpes-Côte d'Azur